Microcorys barbata is a plant in the Lamiaceae family, native to Western Australia. It was first described by Robert Brown in 1810.

References

Taxa named by Robert Brown (botanist, born 1773)
Taxa described in 1810